Diaperini is a tribe of darkling beetles in the family Tenebrionidae. There are about 13 genera and at least 40 described species in Diaperini.

Genera
These 13 genera belong to the tribe Diaperini:

 Adelina Dejean, 1835 i c g b
 Alphitophagus Stephens, 1832 g b
 Cynaeus Leconte, 1862 g b
 Diaperis Geoffroy, 1762 i c g b
 Doliodesmus Spilman, 1967 g b
 Gnatocerus Thunberg, 1814 g b
 Iccius Champion, 1886 g b
 Liodema Horn, 1870 g b
 Neomida Latreille, 1829 g b
 Pentaphyllus Dejean, 1821 g b
 Platydema Laporte & Brullé, 1831 i c g b
 Sitophagus Mulsant, 1854 g b
 Ulomoides Blackburn, 1888 g b

Data sources: i = ITIS, c = Catalogue of Life, g = GBIF, b = Bugguide.net

References

Further reading

External links

 

Tenebrionidae